Francis Lynde (November 12, 1856 – May 16, 1930) was an American author. Three of his books were adapted to film. He was born in Lewiston, New York, and wrote adventure novels set in the American West in the early 20th century. The Chattanooga-Hamilton County Bicentennial Library has a collection of his papers.

His novels were set in the mountains of Colorado, Nevada, and Utah. Railroading and mining provided settings for his storylines. The main characters were often mining or railroad engineers. His collection of detective stories was titled Scientific Sprague. His story Moonshiner of Fact is set in the Appalachian Mountains of Eastern Tennessee.

Mary Antoinette Stickle Lynde (née Stickle; 1867–1960) was his wife. 

He is buried in Forest Hills Cemetery, Chattanooga, Tennessee.

Filmography
 Across the Burning Trestle (1914)
 Stranded in the Arcady (1917) pages 940, 941
 Bucking the Line (1921), based on his 1915 novel The Real Man

Bibliography
 A Case in Equity (1895)
 A Romance in Transit (1897)
 The Helpers (1899)
 A Private Chivalry (1900)
 The Quickening (1906)
 The Taming of Red Butte (1910)
 The Real Man (1915)
 Branded (1917)
 The City of Numbered Days
 Empire Builders  (1907)
 A Fool for Love  
 The Grafters 
 The Honorable Senator Sage-Brush 
 The King of Arcadia
 The Master of Appleby: A Novel Tale Concerning Itself in Part with the Great Struggle in the Two Carolinas; but Chiefly with the Adventures Therein of Two Gentlemen Who Loved One and the Same Lady (English) 
 Pirates' Hope
 The Price 
 The Lawyer’s Livelihood (1909)
 Scientific Sprague (1912)
 The Real Man (1915) 
 After the Manner of Men (1916)
 Stranded in the Arcady
 The Wreckers
 David Vallory (1919) 
 A girl A Horse and a Dog (1920) 
 The Fire Bringers (1921)
 Mr Arnold (1923)
 Mellowing Money, (1925)
 Fight on the Standing Stone, (1925)
 Cripple Creek Nineteen Hundred
 The Cruise of the Cuttlefish (1925)
 The Tenderfoots (1926)
 Blind man’s Bluff (1928)

References

Additional sources
American Fiction, 1901–1925: A Bibliography By Geoffrey D. Smith, partial bibliography, Page 419
Elizabeth Fry Page: Feathers from an Eagles Nest” The Olympian, V2 (V1 and V2 combined), 1903 Page 23–27, Google Books. 
Personal notes on Francis Lynde and his home on Lookout Mountain, Tennessee.

External links

 
 
 
 Francis Lynde at the Encyclopedia of Science Fiction
 
 
 

1856 births
1930 deaths
19th-century American writers
20th-century American writers
American male novelists